Convolvulus kossmatii is a species of plant in the family Convolvulaceae. It is endemic to Socotra.  Its natural habitat is subtropical or tropical dry shrubland.

References

Endemic flora of Socotra
spinosa
Vulnerable plants
Taxonomy articles created by Polbot
Taxobox binomials not recognized by IUCN